Stanley Umude (born April 12, 1999) is an American professional basketball player for the Motor City Cruise of the NBA G League. He played college basketball for the Arkansas Razorbacks and the South Dakota Coyotes.

High school career
Umude attended Earl Warren High School in San Antonio, Texas. As a sophomore, he earned All-District honors. Umude was averaging 24 points per game as a junior before an injury forced him to miss the majority of the season. As a senior, he averaged 23.2 points, 6.2 rebounds, 2.4 blocks and 2.1 assists per game. Umude earned All-District honors. He played AAU basketball for Next Level Raiders. Regarded as the No. 58 prospect in his class according to Rivals, Umude committed to South Dakota in November 2016 over offers from Abilene Christian, Incarnate Word, and New Hampshire.

College career
Umude came off the bench as a freshman and averaged 1.1 points per game. He saw more minutes as a sophomore due to a rash of injuries on the team. Umude scored 28 points on December 18, 2018, in an 89–53 loss to top-ranked Kansas. On January 30, 2019, he scored a career-high 32 points in a 102–71 loss at Purdue Fort Wayne. As a sophomore, Umude averaged 14.4 points and 5.5 rebounds per game. This represented the largest increase in scoring in a single year in Division I, and he earned First Team All-Summit League honors. Following the season, Umude opted to enter the transfer portal, but on May 8, 2019, he announced he was returning to South Dakota. Coming into his junior season, Umude was named preseason Summit League Player of the Year. He finished second on the team to Tyler Hagedorn in scoring at 16.7 points per game while averaging 6.3 rebounds per game and blocking 42 shots. Umude was named to the Second Team All-Summit League.

In his senior season debut on November 25, 2020, Umude recorded 24 points, six rebounds and three blocks in an 84–61 loss to Colorado, becoming the 31st player since 1988 to score 1,000 career points and 50th player in school history. On December 12, he scored a career-high 41 points, and grabbed 11 rebounds in a 91–78 win against South Dakota State. As a senior, Umude averaged 21.5 points, seven rebounds and three assists per game, earning First Team All-Summit League honors. After the season, he transferred to Arkansas.

Professional career

Motor City Cruise (2022–2023)
Umude signed an Exhibit 10 contract with the Detroit Pistons and was added to their training camp roster. On November 3, 2022, Umude was named to the opening night roster for the Motor City Cruise.

Detroit Pistons (2023)
On February 10, 2023, Umude signed a 10-day contract with the Detroit Pistons.

Return to Motor City (2023–present)
On February 20, 2023, Umude was reacquired by the Motor City Cruise.

Career statistics

NBA

Regular season

|-
| style="text-align:left;"|
| style="text-align:left;"|Detroit
| 1 || 0 || 2.0 || .000 || .000 || 1.000 || .0 || .0 || 1.0 || 1.0 || 2.0
|- class="sortbottom"
| style="text-align:center;" colspan="2"|Career
| 1 || 0 || 2.0 || .000 || .000 || 1.000 || .0 || .0 || 1.0 || 1.0 || 2.0
|- class="sortbottom"

College

|-
| style="text-align:left;"| 2017–18
| style="text-align:left;"| South Dakota
| 14 || 0 || 3.4 || .286 || .000 || .700 || .5 || .1 || .1 || .1 || 1.1
|-
| style="text-align:left;"| 2018–19
| style="text-align:left;"| South Dakota
| 30 || 18 || 26.6 || .491 || .351 || .701 || 5.5 || 1.4 || .7 || 1.2 || 14.4
|-
| style="text-align:left;"| 2019–20
| style="text-align:left;"| South Dakota
| 32 || 32 || 30.5 || .459 || .333 || .745 || 6.3 || 2.1 || .7 || 1.3 || 16.7
|-
| style="text-align:left;"| 2020–21
| style="text-align:left;"| South Dakota
| 25 || 25 || 32.3 || .471 || .355 || .799 || 7.0 || 3.0 || .4 || .4 || 21.5
|-
| style="text-align:left;"| 2021–22
| style="text-align:left;"| Arkansas
| 37 || 25 || 27.8 || .460 || .371 || .724 || 4.6 || 1.1 || 1.0 || .8 || 11.9
|- class="sortbottom"
| style="text-align:center;" colspan="2"| Career
| 138 || 100 || 26.5 || .468 || .352 || .744 || 5.2 || 1.6 || .7 || .9 || 14.2

Personal life
Umude's brother Sidney played basketball at Youngstown State before being expelled due to allegations of sexual assault and transferring to Southern. Umude is a fan of the Oklahoma City Thunder.

References

External links
Arkansas Razorbacks bio
South Dakota Coyotes bio

1999 births
Living people
American men's basketball players
Arkansas Razorbacks men's basketball players
Basketball players from San Antonio
Detroit Pistons players
Motor City Cruise players
Shooting guards
South Dakota Coyotes men's basketball players
Undrafted National Basketball Association players